Zhu Jiaxuan (born 13 April 1999) is a Chinese footballer currently playing as a midfielder for Liaoning Shenyang Urban, on loan from Dalian Pro.

Club career
Zhu started his career with the youth team of Villarreal CF in Spain before returning to China and joining the Dalian Yifang youth system. Zhu was promoted to the Dalian Pro first team squad for the 2020 season. He made his professional debut on 3 September 2020 against Henan Jianye.

Career statistics

References

External links
 

1999 births
Living people
Chinese footballers
Chinese expatriate footballers
Association football forwards
Chinese Super League players
Villarreal CF players
Dalian Professional F.C. players
Chinese expatriate sportspeople in Spain
Expatriate footballers in Spain